Alexander Zverev (born 1997) is a German tennis player.

Alexander Zverev may also refer to:

Alexander Zverev (sprinter) (born 1989), Russian sprinter
Alexander Zverev Sr. (born 1960), Russian former tennis player, father of Mischa and Alexander Jr.